"Tiptoe Through the Tulips", also known as "Tip Toe Through the Tulips with Me", is a popular song published in 1929. The song was written by Al Dubin (lyrics) and Joe Burke (music) and made popular by guitarist Nick Lucas. On February 5, 1968, singer Tiny Tim made the song a novelty hit by singing it on the popular American television show Rowan & Martin's Laugh-In.

Recording history

"Crooning Troubadour" Nick Lucas topped the U.S. charts with "Tiptoe Through the Tulips" in 1929, after introducing the song in the musical "talkie" film Gold Diggers of Broadway. Lucas's recording held the number 1 position for 10 weeks. Other artists charted with the song in 1929, including Jean Goldkette (number 5), Johnny Marvin (number 11), and Roy Fox (number 18).

The song was recorded and then released in April 1968 by Tiny Tim on his album God Bless Tiny Tim. Produced by Richard Perry, Tim's version charted at number 17 in the United States that year, becoming his signature song; which he would continue to perform throughout his career. Side B of the released single included the song "Fill Your Heart".

In popular culture

The song was used in Sinkin' in the Bathtub, the first Looney Tunes cartoon short, in 1930.  It is also heard in the opening scene of the 1945 film Confidential Agent.

The song is sung by Dr. Smith and again by the Robot in the Lost in Space episode "Space Circus".

The song was sung on a 1966 episode of The Lawrence Welk Show with The Lennon Sisters as vocals although they were missing Peggy at the time.

The song was played on pipe organ by Herbert Lom in 1976 movie The Pink Panther Strikes Again.

The song is mentioned in the 1997 book Harry Potter and the Philosopher's Stone. Vernon Dursley hums the song while boarding up small cracks around the front and back doors of his house so he can stop letters from Hogwarts reaching Harry.

The song is featured in the 2010 horror film Insidious.

Welsh indie pop band Los Campesinos! released a song title "Tiptoe Through the True Bits" in 2012, with the song's title being a reference to Tiptoe Through the Tulips.

Sheff G and Sleepy Hallow released the single "Tip Toe" sampling the song.

References 

Songs with lyrics by Al Dubin
Songs with music by Joe Burke (composer)
1929 songs
1968 singles
Songs about flowers
Novelty songs
Tiny Tim (musician) songs
Creepypasta
Ballads